Holy Trinity Parish - designated for Polish immigrants in Lowell, Massachusetts, United States.

 Founded in 1904. It is one of the Polish-American Roman Catholic parishes in New England in the Archdiocese of Boston.

History 

Holy Trinity Parish of Lowell, Massachusetts started around  1893.
With help of Fr. John Chmielinski, pastor of the Polish-American parish in South Boston, promised aid,  a fund was started, and in 1903 land was purchased on High St. and in the spring of 1904, construction works have started. The architect was T. Edward Sheehan from Boston. In June 1904 the Archbishop Stanislaw Williams commissioned Fr. Alexander Ogonowskiego to live in Lowell and  the canonical mission to organize and establish a Polish-American church. There were about 80 Polish families at that time.

On August 19, 1904, Bishop Allen of Mobile diocese, made the consecration of the new church.

In 1907  completed the construction of schools and it was placed under the patronage of the youth saint, St. Stanislaus Kostka. It was the first Polish parochial school in the Archdiocese of Boston. In 1910, nuns from the Congregation of the Felician Sisters of Buffalo, New York, began work at the school.

In 1927 five acres of land was purchased for their own cemetery, across from St. Patrick cemetery.

After World War II were erected a beautiful marble Passion (Crucifixion scene) and the altar, the place where every year is celebrated Mass. during the celebrations Memorial Day. At the base of the altar lie the remains of parishioners, who paid the supreme sacrifice for the country.

Today the parish continues to be a beacon of hope and light. In 2004 the Roman Catholic Archdiocese of Boston attempted to close Holy Trinity Parish after closing its parish school. The parish reluctantly appealed to the Vatican and was granted to stay open. The parish continues to be open and is a fully active and traditional Catholic parish. It is open to all ethnic groups although the Polish community holds a special place. It has an active Holy Name Society, choir, Our Lady Solidarity, and strong Religious Education program. All are welcome.

Pastors 

 Fr. Stanislaw Aleksander Ogonowski (1904–1955)
 Fr. Edward Naguszewski (1955–1976)
 Fr. John Abucewicz (1976]-1995)
 Fr. Jon C. Martin (1995–1997)
 Fr. Stanislaw Kempa (1997-2014)
 Rev. Nicholas A. Sannella (2014 - )

Parish organizations 

 Holy Name Society (pol. Towarzystwo Najświętszego Imienia)
 Our Lady of Czestochowa Sodality (pol. Sodalicja Matki Bożej Częstochowskiej)
 Knights of Columbus

Parish Schools 

 St. Stanislaus School.

Closed

See also
List of churches in the Roman Catholic Archdiocese of Boston

References

Bibliography 

 Our Lady of Czestochowa Parish - Centennial 1893-1993
 The Official Catholic Directory in USA

External links 
 Holy Trinity - ParishesOnline.com
 Holy Trinity - TheCatholicDirectory.com
 Roman Catholic Archdiocese of Boston
 TheBostonPilot.com

Roman Catholic parishes of Archdiocese of Boston
Polish-American Roman Catholic parishes in Massachusetts
Churches in Lowell, Massachusetts